Following is an alphabetical list of notable buildings, sites and monuments located in New York City in the United States.  The borough is indicated in parentheses.

 American Museum of Natural History (Manhattan)
 Rose Center for Earth and Space
 America's Response Monument (Manhattan)
 Apollo Theater (Manhattan)
 Bank of America Tower (Manhattan)
 Battery Park (Manhattan)
 Castle Clinton
 East Coast Memorial
 The Sphere
 Battery Park City Ferry Terminal (Manhattan)
 Brill Building (Manhattan) 
 Bronx Zoo (Bronx)
 Brooklyn Botanic Garden (Brooklyn)
 Brooklyn Bridge (connects Brooklyn and Manhattan) 
 Brooklyn Museum (Brooklyn)
 Brooklyn Public Library (Brooklyn)
 Bryant Park (Manhattan)
 Burton Arms Apartments
 Carnegie Hall (Manhattan)
 Cathedral of St. John the Divine (Manhattan)
 Central Park (Manhattan)
 Central Park Zoo
 Strawberry Fields
 Chelsea Piers (Manhattan)
 Chrysler Building (Manhattan)
 Citi Field (Queens)
 Cleopatra's Needle
 College Point Little League Building (Queens)
 Columbia University (Manhattan)
 Columbus Circle (Manhattan)
 Downtown Athletic Club (Manhattan)
 East River Park (Manhattan)
 East River State Park (Brooklyn)
 Eleanor Roosevelt Monument
 Empire State Building (Manhattan)
 Federal Hall National Memorial (Manhattan)
 Firemen's Memorial (Manhattan)
 Flatiron Building (Manhattan)
 Flushing Meadows-Corona Park (Queens)
 Fordham University (Bronx)
 George Gustav Heye Center (Manhattan)
 George Washington Bridge (connects Manhattan and New Jersey)
 Gracie Mansion (Manhattan)
 Grand Army Plaza (Brooklyn)
 Grand Central Terminal (Manhattan)
 General Grant National Memorial (Manhattan)
 Green-Wood Cemetery (Brooklyn)
 Hall of Fame for Great Americans (Bronx)
 Harvard Club of New York (Manhattan)
 Historic Richmond Town (Staten Island)
Holland Tunnel (connects Manhattan and New Jersey)
 Intrepid Sea, Air & Space Museum (Manhattan)
 Irish Hunger Memorial (Manhattan)
 Lincoln Center for the Performing Arts (Manhattan)
 Avery Fisher Hall
 David H. Koch Theater (formerly known as the New York State Theater)
 Metropolitan Opera
 Lincoln Tunnel (connects Manhattan and New Jersey)
 Lipstick Building (Manhattan)
 Macy's Herald Square (Manhattan)
 Madison Square Garden (Manhattan)
 Manhattan Bridge (connects Manhattan and Brooklyn)
 Manhattan Municipal Building (Manhattan)
 Metropolitan Fireproof Warehouse (Manhattan)
 Metropolitan Museum of Art (Manhattan)
 MetLife Building (Manhattan)
 Museum of Modern Art (Manhattan)
 National September 11 Memorial & Museum (Manhattan)
 New York City Hall (Manhattan)
 New York Botanical Garden (Bronx)
 New York Evening Post Building (Manhattan)
 New York Life Building (Manhattan)
 New York Public Library (Manhattan)
 New York Stock Exchange (Manhattan)
 Odd Fellows Hall (Manhattan)
 Paley Center for Media (Manhattan)
 Pelham Bay Park (The Bronx)
 Pennsylvania Station (Manhattan)
 Pier 11/Wall Street (Manhattan)
 Plaza Hotel (Manhattan)
 Prison Ship Martyrs' Monument  (Brooklyn)
 Prospect Park (Brooklyn)
 Prospect Park Zoo
 Queens Museum of Art (Queens)
 Racquet and Tennis Club (Manhattan)
 Rockefeller Center (Manhattan)
 Radio City Music Hall (Manhattan)
 St. Patrick's Cathedral (Manhattan)
 Seagram Building (Manhattan)
 Shea Stadium (Queens; demolished 2009)
 Silvercup Studios (Queens)
 Solomon R. Guggenheim Museum (Manhattan)
 Statue of Liberty (Manhattan)
 Times Square (Manhattan)
 Trinity Church (Manhattan)
 United Nations Headquarters (Manhattan)
 Vietnam Veterans Plaza (Manhattan)
 The Waldorf-Astoria Hotel (Manhattan)
 Washington Square Park (Manhattan)
 New York University campus
 Williamsburg Bridge (connects Manhattan and Brooklyn)
 Woodlawn Cemetery (Bronx)
 Woolworth Building (Manhattan)
 World Trade Center site (Manhattan)
 World Financial Center (Manhattan)
 Yankee Stadium (Bronx)

Skyscrapers
(in height order; unless otherwise noted, all are in Manhattan)

 One World Trade Center   
 Empire State Building 
 Bank of America Tower 		
 Chrysler Building 
 American International Building 
 40 Wall Street 
 Citigroup Center 
 Trump World Tower 
 Bloomberg Tower 
 GE Building 
 CitySpire Center 
 One Chase Manhattan Plaza 
 Condé Nast Building 
 MetLife Building 
 Woolworth Building 
 One Worldwide Plaza 
 Carnegie Hall Tower 
 383 Madison Avenue (formerly known as the Bear Stearns Building)

See also

 Geography of New York Harbor
 List of National Historic Landmarks in New York City
 List of neighborhoods in New York City
 List of New York City Designated Landmarks
 National Register of Historic Places listings in New York
 List of New York City parks
 List of nightclubs in New York City

External links
 Official maps of NYC landmarks
 Historic Districts in NYC
 Landmarks of NYC
 Virtual map of LGBTQ and feminist landmarks

Buildings
 
Buildings, sites, and monuments
Buildings, sites, and monuments